Kapileswarapuram is a village in the Mandal of the same name in Konaseema district in the state of Andhra Pradesh in India.

Geography
The Godavari river flows through the village. The Zamindari Board Middle School was founded in 1918, later changed to a High School and renamed after the Zamindar Sri Balusu Buchi Sarvarayudu garu.

References 

Villages in Konaseema district